HMS Ariadne was launched at Cowes in 1803 as the civilian vessel Ariadne. The Royal Navy purchased her in July 1805 as an advice boat and commissioned her under Lieutenant John Wells. It renamed her HMS Dove later that year, and then in 1806 renamed her HMS Flight.

In September 1806 Flight disappeared in the English Channel, and was presumed to have foundered with the loss of all hands.

Citations

References
 
 

1803 ships
Ships built in England
Age of Sail merchant ships of England
Cutters of the Royal Navy
Maritime incidents in 1806
Missing ships
Warships lost with all hands
Shipwrecks in the English Channel